Jonathan David & Melissa Helser are an American Christian music husband and wife duo from Sophia, North Carolina, who started their music recording careers together in 2013. They have released three studio albums with Bethel Music, Endless Ocean, Bottomless Sea (2014), On the Shores (2015) and Beautiful Surrender (2016). Their last album, Beautiful Surrender, was their breakthrough released upon the Billboard magazine charts.

Music history
The husband and wife duo commenced their recording careers together in 2013, with releasing their first studio album, Endless Ocean, Bottomless Sea, on November 24, 2014, using the Bethel Music recording label. They released, On the Shores, with Bethel Music, on June 9, 2015. Their third studio album, Beautiful Surrender, was released on September 30, 2016, from Bethel Music. This album was their breakthrough release on the Billboard (magazine) charts, where it peaked on The Billboard 200 at No. 54, Christian Albums at No. 1, and Canadian Albums at No. 67.

Discography

Studio albums

Live albums

EPs

Singles

References

External links
 
 Relevant Magazine interview

American musical duos
Musical groups established in 2013
Musical groups from North Carolina
2013 establishments in North Carolina
Performers of contemporary worship music